Minuscule 813 (in the Gregory-Aland numbering), is a Greek minuscule manuscript of the New Testament written on parchment. Palaeographically it had been assigned to the 12th century.

Description 
The codex contains the text of the four Gospels, on 70 (?) parchment leaves (size ). According to Gregory the manuscript contained texts of: Matthew 27:14-30; 28:1-18; Mark 7:31-16:20; Luke 1:1-12:6.

The text is written in one column per page, 27 lines per page.

There is also another division according to the Ammonian Sections (in Mark 237 Sections, the last section in 16,14), with references to the Eusebian Canons (written below Ammonian Sections numbers).

The textual character of the codex is unknown because no one examined its readings.

History 
The manuscript was dated by Gregory to the 12th century.

The manuscript was found in Corfu by Gregory in 1886. It belonged to Archbishop Eustathius.

It was added to the list of New Testament manuscripts by Gregory (813e).

The manuscript has been lost. Actual owner of the manuscript and place of its housing is unknown.

See also 

 List of New Testament minuscules
 Biblical manuscript
 Textual criticism
 Minuscule 811
 Minuscule 814

References

Further reading 

 

Greek New Testament minuscules
12th-century biblical manuscripts
Lost biblical manuscripts